Aimless Walk (Bezúčelná procházka) is a 7:54 min. 1930 film by the Czech filmmaker Alexander Hackenschmied aka Alexander Hammid.

The film belongs to the experimental documentary genre. It is an example of European cinema's avant-garde tradition and has been placed alongside city symphony films such as Man with a Movie Camera and Manhatta.

References

Literatura 

 Anděl, Jaroslav. (2000). Alexandr Hackenschmied. Praha.
 Drubek, Natascha. (2012). "Bezúčelná Procházka" / "Aimless Walk" (1930): Alexander Hackenschmied's "Film Study" of a Tram Ride to the Outskirts of Prague – Libeň. Bohemia (Munich, Germany). 52. 10.18447/BoZ-2012-3749. .

Films 
Martina Kudláček’s documentary Aimless Walk – Alexander Hammid
(1996 by Česká Televize & Mina Film).

External links

1930 films
Czech documentary films
Czech avant-garde and experimental films
1930s avant-garde and experimental films
Documentary films about cities
Films shot in Prague
Films set in Prague
1930 documentary films
Czechoslovak documentary films
Czechoslovak avant-garde and experimental films
1930s Czech films